Tripogandra is a genus of flowering plants in the spiderwort family, Commelinaceae. It is native to the Western Hemisphere from central Mexico and the West Indies south to Argentina.

 Species
 Tripogandra amplexans Handlos - central + southern Mexico
 Tripogandra amplexicaulis (Klotzsch ex C.B.Clarke) Woodson - central + southern Mexico, Guatemala, Honduras, Nicaragua, Costa Rica 
 Tripogandra angustifolia (B.L.Rob.) Woodson - Mexico, Guatemala
 Tripogandra brasiliensis Handlos - eastern Brazil
 Tripogandra disgrega (Kunth) Woodson - Mexico, Guatemala, Honduras, El Salvador
 Tripogandra diuretica (Mart.) Handlos - Brazil, Bolivia, Argentina, Paraguay. Uruguay
 Tripogandra elata D.R.Hunt - Goiás, Brasília 
 Tripogandra encolea (Diels) J.F.Macbr. - Bolivia, Ecuador, Peru
 Tripogandra glandulosa (Seub.) Rohweder - Trinidad, Venezuela, French Guiana, Peru, Brazil, Bolivia, Argentina, Paraguay. Uruguay
 Tripogandra guerrerensis Matuda - Guerrero
 Tripogandra ionantha (Diels) J.F.Macbr. - Peru
 Tripogandra kruseana Matuda - Guerrero
 Tripogandra montana Handlos - southern Mexico, Guatemala, Honduras, El Salvador
 Tripogandra multiflora (Sw.) Raf. - from southern Mexico south to Argentina, plus Jamaica + Trinidad; naturalized in Azores
 Tripogandra neglecta Handlos - Minas Gerais
 Tripogandra palmeri (Rose) Woodson - western Mexico from Sinaloa south to Guerrero
 Tripogandra purpurascens (S.Schauer) Handlos - from northern Mexico south to Argentina
 Tripogandra saxicola (Greenm.) Woodson - Morelos, Puebla, Guerrero
 Tripogandra serrulata (Vahl) Handlos - central + southern Mexico, Central America, West Indies, northern South America
 Tripogandra silvatica Handlos - Veracruz
 Tripogandra warmingiana (Seub.) Handlos - Bahia, Minas Gerais, Rio de Janeiro

References

External links 

Commelinaceae
Commelinales genera
Taxa named by Constantine Samuel Rafinesque